They Were There (also known as IBM Centennial Film: They Were There - People who changed the way the world works) is a 2011 documentary short film directed by Oscar winner Errol Morris. It is a centennial film about the company IBM.

References

External links

IBM Centennial Film: They Were There - People who changed the way the world works

American short documentary films
IBM
2011 films
Films directed by Errol Morris
Films scored by Philip Glass
2011 short documentary films
Sponsored films
Promotional films
2010s English-language films
2010s American films